Dach is an abbreviation for the organic compound trans-1,2-Diaminocyclohexane.

Dach or DACH may also refer to:
 DACH, an acronym for Deutschland (Germany), Austria, Confoederatio Helvetica (Swiss Confederation), the countries with German-speaking majorities
 Dach (surname)
 DACH ligand or Trost ligand, derived from trans-1,2-Diaminocyclohexane
 1,2-Cyclohexanediamine DACH Di Amino Cyclo Hexane
 DACH1 or Dachshund homolog 1, a protein encoded by the human DACH1 gene

See also
 Dachs (disambiguation)